Ink Master: Shop Wars is the ninth season of the tattoo reality competition Ink Master that premiered on June 6, 2017, on Spike with 16 episodes. The show is hosted and judged by Jane's Addiction guitarist Dave Navarro, with accomplished tattoo artists Chris Núñez and Oliver Peck serving as series regular judges. The winning shop received $200,000, a feature in Inked magazine, the title of Ink Master, and the title of Master Shop.

The premise of this season was having teams of two sorted by their tattoo shops going head-to-head in a tag team elimination-style competition. This season features nine rookie shops battling nine veteran shops each week while tackling a skill that exposes each veterans' shortcoming from the last time they competed.

This season saw the return of thirteen veterans; season one contestant Tommy Helm, who originally finished the competition as the runner-up, season two contestant Lalo Yunda, who originally finished the competition in 10th place, season three contestants Yovan "E.S." Barraza and Richard "Made Rich" Parker, who originally finished the competition in 9th and 10th place respectively, season four contestants Aaron "Bubba" Irwin and Josh "King Ruck" Glover, who originally finished the competition in 11th/12th and 9th/10th place respectively, season five contestant Aaron "Aaron Is" Michalowski, who originally finished the competition in 6th place, season five and season seven contestant James "Cleen Rock One" Steinke, who originally finished both competitions as the runner-up, season six contestants Katie McGowan and Matt O'Baugh, who originally finished the competition in 8th and 3rd place respectively, season seven contestants Christian Buckingham and Picasso Dular, who originally finished the competition in 3rd and 13th place respectively, and season eight contestant Anwon "Boneface" Johnson, who originally finished the competition in 7th place.

The winners of the ninth season of Ink Master were Old Town Ink (Aaron "Bubba" Irwin and DJ Tambe), with Black Cobra Tattoos (Katie McGowan and Matt O'Baugh) being the runners-up.

Judging and ranking

Judging Panel
The judging panel is a table of three or more primary judges. The judges make their final decision by voting to see who had best tattoo of the day, who's going home and who wins the competition.

Jury of Peers
The shops critique each other's work to see who had the worst tattoo of the day that will send one of them to the bottom.

Contestants
The competition featured a total of 36 contestants who competed in teams of two (18 teams total). Each team acted as one throughout the competition, winning together, and losing together.

Shop names, contestant names, and cities stated are at time of filming.

Returning veterans

Shop progress
 Indicates a Newcomer shop.
 Indicates a Veteran shop.

  The shop won Ink Master.
 The shop was the runner-up.
 The shop finished third in the competition.
 The shop advanced to the finale
 The shop was exempt from the first elimination.
 The shop won Best Tattoo of the Day.
 The shop was among the top.
 The shop received positive critiques.
 The shop received negative critiques.
 The shop was in the bottom.
 The shop was put in the bottom by the Jury of Peers
 The shop was eliminated from the competition.
 The shop was put in the bottom by the Jury of Peers and were eliminated from the competition.
 The shop returned as a guest for that episode.

Episodes

References

External links
 
 
 

Ink Master
2017 American television seasons